Martin Wille (born 29 May 1986) is a former international footballer from Liechtenstein who played as a defender and midfielder. Wille played club football for FC Balzers.

External links

1986 births
Living people
Liechtenstein footballers
Liechtenstein international footballers
FC Balzers players
Association football defenders